FC Kabardey-ZET Nizhny Cherek was a Russian football team from Nizhny Cherek, Kabardino-Balkaria. It played professionally for one season in 1996, taking 13th place in Zone 1 of the Russian Third League. It also played in Kabardino-Balkaria championship.

External links
  Team history at KLISF

Defunct football clubs in Russia
Sport in Kabardino-Balkaria